Zdravko "Bato" Govedarica (April 17, 1928 – March 13, 2006) was an American professional basketball player.

Playing career 
Govedarica attended Chicago's Lane Tech High School and DePaul University.  A 5'11" (180 cm) guard, he was inducted into the Chicago Basketball Hall of Fame on May 13, 2006. He played 23 games for the Syracuse Nationals during the 1953–54 National Basketball Association season.

Personal life 
Govedarica  was the son of Serb immigrants Teodor and Ana from Avtovac, a village near Gacko in modern-day Bosnia and Herzegovina.

NBA career statistics

Regular season

See also 
 List of Serbian Americans

References

External links
 

1928 births
2006 deaths
American men's basketball players
American military personnel of the Korean War
American people of Serbian descent
Basketball players from Chicago
DePaul Blue Demons men's basketball players
Point guards
Syracuse Nationals draft picks
Syracuse Nationals players